Kanan Singh Gill is an Indian stand-up comedian, actor and YouTuber. He won the Punch Line Bangalore Competition. He is known for hosting the YouTube series Pretentious Movie Reviews where he reviews campy Bollywood films along with fellow stand-up comedian Biswa Kalyan Rath. He was one of the main personalities behind the YouTube Comedy Hunt and also co-hosted the YouTube FanFest India. In 2017, he released his own one-hour comedy special, Keep It Real on Amazon Prime Video. He made his debut on the big screen with the movie Noor, alongside Sonakshi Sinha. In 2018, he was also a judge on Comicstaan, a comedic reality TV show, on Amazon Prime Video.

Early life
Kanan was born in Bareilly to a Sikh family and spent his early years in Dehradun and Delhi. His father Charanjit Singh Gill, an officer with the Indian Army was also the principal of Rashtriya Military School, Bangalore. At an early age he was brought to Bengaluru. He did his schooling at Ahlcon Public School, New Delhi and The Frank Anthony Public School, Bengaluru. He pursued a B.E. in Computer Science at MS Ramaiah Institute of Technology. He was a part of a band where he later became the lead singer when he started writing "funny songs".

Career
Kanan worked as a software engineer at Exeter Group Inc., for three years. In the meantime, he participated in and won a competition called Punchline Bangalore followed by another win at the Comedy Store in Mumbai. He then quit his job to pursue a career in comedy.

He gained popularity with the viral YouTube series Pretentious Movie Reviews. He reviewed critically panned  popular Hindi movies along with Biswa Kalyan Rath. Kanan also worked in an improvised sketch comedy show, The Living Room on Comedy Central. Gill made his acting debut in Sunhil Sippy's Noor in 2017, alongside Sonakshi Sinha. The same year, Gill launched his special Keep It Real on the Amazon Prime Video. In 2020, his special 'Yours Sincerely' was released on Netflix.

Kanan also features sporadically on projects created by his friends and colleagues, notably on Better Life Foundation, a web series by Them Boxer Shorts, as well as on many other sketches, videos, and podcasts created or hosted by fellow comedians.

Filmography

Film

Web

References

External links

Indian stand-up comedians
Living people
Indian male comedians
1989 births
Indian YouTubers